Dave Hilton may refer to:

Dave Hilton (baseball) (1950–2017), American former baseball player
Dave Hilton (rugby union) (born 1970), British former rugby union player
Dave Hilton Jr. (born 1963), Canadian former boxer
Dave Hilton Sr. (born 1940), Canadian former boxing trainer
David Hilton (auto designer), European auto designer
David Hilton (footballer) (born 1977), English footballer